is a Japanese photographer known for his work in Tsugaru and New York. He has also written about photography.

Books by Akiyama

Tsugaru: Ryōji-sensei gyōjōki. Hirosaki: Tsugaru Shobō, 1978.  Photographs of Tsugaru.
Nyūyōku tsūshin: Akiyama Ryōji shashin. Tokyo: Bokusuisha, 1980.  Photographs of New York City.
你好小朋友 Chūgoku no kodomotachi: Akiyama Ryōji shashinshū. Tokyo: Sakura Family Club, 1983.  Photographs of children in China.
Narakawa-mura. Tokyo: Asahi-shinbunsha, 1991. .  Photographs of Narakawa (Nagano prefecture).
Fotokontesuto hisshō gaido / Photo Contest Success Guide. Reberu-appu mook. Tokyo: Gakken, 1995. . 
Fotokontesuto hisshō: Kodomo no torikata. Reberu-appu mook. Tokyo: Gakken, 1998. . 
Kodomo no shashin no torikata: Kawaiku toru kihon kara fotokontesuto chōsen made(). Tokyo: Gakken, 1999. .  Book about taking photographs of children.
"Tsugaru Ryōji-sensei gyōjōki": Akiyama Ryōji sakuhinten. JCII Photo Salon Library 118. Tokyo: JCII Photo Salon, 2001.  Booklet showing photographs from the series shown in the book of 1978.
Nara: Akiyama Ryōji shashinshū / Nara. Tokyo: Yūjin Kōbō, 2006. .  Photographs of Nara.
Sensu no kemuri: Shashinka no tsūshinbo. 2014.

References

Japanese photographers
Writers on photographic techniques
1942 births
Living people